The Khawr Abd Allah is today an estuary, but once was the point where the Shatt al-Arab emptied into the Persian Gulf. It is located in southern Iraq and northern Kuwait. Both countries' border divides the lower portion of the estuary, but adjacent to the port of Umm Qasr, the estuary becomes wholly Iraqi. The Shatt al-Arab is now the from which the rivers drain out and is east of the Khawr Abd Allah. As the estuary extends northwestward into Iraq, it changes its name to Khawr az-Zubayr at Umm Qasr. From that point, it links by canal again to the northwest and into the Tigris and Euphrates proper. It forms the northeastern coastline of Jazirat Bubiyan and the northern coastline of Jazirat Warbah. Both of these islands are officially Kuwait, however Iraq does claim them.

It has also lent its name to the maritime Khawr Abd Allah Protocols, Kor Abd Allah or KAA Interoperability Protocols, first developed by the British Royal Navy between March and June 2008 during the British command of Combined Task Force 158 in close co-operation with Kuwaiti and Iraqi senior naval personnel and government advisers.

The legally-nonbinding KAA Interoperability Protocols were developed and mediated between the heads of the Kuwaiti and Iraqi navies by Major David Hammond Royal Marines, the British naval barrister and legal advisor to CTF 158 who is now the CEO of the UK charity Human Rights at Sea and separately independently practices law as an English barrister.

The Protocols included the production of the KAA Interoperability Admiralty Chart by Major Hammond and was subsequently distributed to both countries after theybhad been produced by the United Kingdom Hydrographic Office. On November 11, 2008, the KAA Protocols were historically signed at Kuwait Naval Base after they had been verbally agreed on board  on 8 May 2008. The signing saw the first formal meeting of the heads of the respective navies since before the 1991 Gulf War. Subsequently, the success of the legally-nonbinding protocols was reported to the US Congress on January 9, 2009 in the Measuring Stability and Security in Iraq Report. The detail of the text of the KAA Interoperability Protocols has now been made available open source over the Internet from leaked US diplomatic documents.

More recently, the former Head of the Kuwaiti Navy, Major-General Ahmad Yousef Al-Mulla, was invited to speak at the United Kingdom's Royal College of Defence Studies (RCDS) in London on February 1, 2012 on the topic of the Khor Abdallah waterway as part of a lecture covering Kuwaiti-Iraqi maritime boundary interactions and future relations. The lecture was introduced by Lord Astor of Hever John Astor, 3rd Baron Astor of Hever, the United Kingdom government's Parliamentary Under Secretary of State (Ministry of Defense) and the Commandant Royal College of Defence Studies Vice Admiral Charles Style. It was also attended by representatives of the Iraqi embassy in London.

In September 2019, the Kuwaiti newspaper Al Rai allegedly claimed that Iraq submitted a letter of complaint to the UN Secretary General and UN Security Council that accused Kuwait of geographical changes to its maritime border at the Khor Abdullah waterway.

References

External links
http://www.usnwc.edu/getattachment/16048719-a2e3-4107-bbff-b0fe0b64e1e4/03-Stich-(RELEASABLE)
http://www.defense.gov/home/features/iraq_reports/index.html
https://web.archive.org/web/20150214025027/http://www.leakoverflow.com/questions/554987/09kuwait465-protocols-assist-iraqi-and-kuwaiti-navies-in
http://www.cablegatesearch.net/cable.php?id=09BAGHDAD1912
http://www.conservatives.com/people/peers/astor_john.aspx

Rivers of Iraq
Geography of Kuwait
Iraq–Kuwait relations